The Bulletin of the Astronomical Society of India is the official quarterly peer-reviewed scientific journal of the Astronomical Society of India established in 1973 and published until the end of 2014. It covers all areas of astrophysics and astronomy. The editor-in-chief is D. J. Saikia (National Centre for Radio Astrophysics).

Editors
The following persons have been editor-in-chief of the journal:
 D. J. Saikia (2010–2014)
 G. C. Anupama (2004–2010)
 H. C. Bhatt (2001–2004)
 Vinod Krishnan (1995–2001)
 K. D. Abhyankar (1992–1995)
 S. K. Trehan (1981–1992)
 M. S. Vardya (1974–1981)

References

External links

Publications established in 1973
Astronomy journals
English-language journals
Quarterly journals
Academic journals published by learned and professional societies of India